The Central Illinois Conference or CIC, is a high school athletic conference in Central Illinois. The first year of existence was the 2014-15 school year. Its schools belong to the IHSA and compete in many sports and other activities.

History
The conference started in the 2014-15 school year and originally included Argenta-Oreana, Clinton, St. Teresa, Meridian, Central A&M, Sullivan, Shelbyville, Warrensburg-Latham, and Tuscola all schools from the Okaw Valley Conference. Before the actual forming of the CIC, Argenta-Oreana decided to join the Little Okaw Valley Conference, so this left the new conference with 8 schools. On December 13, 2021, St. Teresa was removed from the conference by a 6-1 vote, with Sullivan abstaining from the vote. Sullivan abstained from the vote due to accepting an invitation to join the Lincoln Prairie Conference beginning in the 2023-24 school year.

Member schools
Departing members highlighted in red

There are 8 member schools in the Conference.

Sports
The conference offers the following sports:

Boys sports
 Football, basketball, baseball, golf, track and field (all schools)
 Cross-country (all schools except Meridian)
 Soccer (Meridian, St. Teresa,) (Warrensburg-Latham Co-op with Maroa-Forsyth)
 Wrestling (Clinton, Shelbyville, Warrenburg-Latham)
 Swimming and diving (Clinton, St. Teresa, Sullivan Co-op with Shelbyville, Tuscola)
 Tennis (Meridian, Shelbyville, St. Teresa)

Girls sports
 Volleyball, basketball, softball, track and field (all schools)
 Cross-country (all schools except Meridian)
 Golf (all schools except Warrensburg-Latham)
 Soccer (St. Teresa, Meridian) (Warrensburg-Latham Co-op with Maroa-Forsyth)
 Competitive cheering (all schools except Tuscola and Warrensburg-Latham)
 Tennis  (Central A&M, Shelbyville, St. Teresa, Warrensburg-Latham)
 Swimming and diving (Clinton, St. Teresa, Sullivan co-op with Shelbyville, Tuscola)

IHSA State Level Successes
 Central A&M- Boys Football: 2nd place 1992, 2nd place 1995, 2nd place 1996, 1st place 1997, 2nd place 2001 and 2nd place 2019. Girls Basketball: 3rd place 2007–08, 4th place 2013-14, 1st place 2014-15, 2nd place 2015-16. Girls Track: 2011-12 1st place, 2012-13 1st place
 Clinton: Boys Golf: 2nd place 1996–97. Boys Wrestling: 3rd place 1989–90, 2nd place 1992–93, 4th place 1993–94, 2nd place 1999–2000, 3rd place 2000–01
 Meridian- Boys Basketball: 1st place 2008–09. Boys Football: 2nd place 1999
 St. Teresa- Girls Cross Country won state in 2010. Girls tennis: 2nd in doubles in state in 2009,1A Runner up Football in 2016,Boys Soccer State 3rd place 2018, 2A Football Final Four 2018,2A Football Final Four 2019, Volleyball State Champions 2019
 Shelbyville- Boys Basketball: 1st place 1996, Competitive Cheering: 1st place 2005–06
 Sullivan- Boys Baseball: 2nd place 1997–98. Boys Golf: 3rd place 1979–80. Boys Track: 2nd place 1985–86. Girls Basketball: 1st place 1990–91, 2nd place 1991–92. Girls Track: 3rd place 2013–14, 2014–15. Scholastic Bowl: 4th place 1992–93 & 2000–01
 Tuscola- Boys Football: 1st place 2006–07 & 2009–10, 2nd place 2007–08, 2010–11, 2011-12. Boys Baseball: 4th place 2007–08. Boys Track: 3rd place 2007–08. Girls Softball: 4th place 2011-12
 Warrensburg-Latham- Boys Basketball: 3rd place 2002–03 & 2007–08. Girls Softball: 2nd place 2003–04. Scholastic Bowl: 1st place 2000–01, 3rd place 2008–09

Membership timeline

See also
 List of Illinois High School Association member conferences

References

External links
 http://www.illinoishsglorydays.com
 http://www.ihsa.com
 http://www.cicsports.com

Illinois high school sports conferences